The Open University of the Netherlands is a Dutch  institution for distance learning at university level. It is an independent government-funded university and uses a variety of methods, including written materials, the Internet, and occasional evening seminars or day sessions.

Overview 
The Open University of the Netherlands was founded in 1984 and opened to students that September. The administration is based in Heerlen, in the province of Limburg, in the very south of the Netherlands. The university has study and support centres dispersed throughout the continental Netherlands, as well as study centres in Dutch-speaking Belgium (Flanders) and partnerships with institutions in Aruba, Bonaire, Curaçao, Sint Maarten and Suriname.

Since the Open University was founded, more than 250,000 students have enrolled in courses. , approximately 15,000 students were enrolled at study or support centres in the Netherlands, including some residents of other countries.

Aims 
The Dutch government's purpose in founding the Open University of the Netherlands was to make higher education accessible to anyone with the necessary aptitudes and interests, regardless of formal qualifications. The university aims to provide cost-effective education and to encourage innovation in Dutch higher education, in terms of both curriculum and teaching.

Organisation

Governance 
The Chairman of the Open University of the Netherlands since June 2016 is Arent van der Feltz, former Vice President for Corporate Development, Legal, Regulatory and Public Affairs at Ziggo. His predecessor was Sander van den Eijnden.

Faculties 
 Science: Environmental Sciences, Computer Science and Information Science
 Humanities
 Management
 Educational Sciences
 Psychology
 Law

In addition to this, the university has four expertise centres: 
 CAROU: guidance in the deployment of technological and social innovations through research projects and education in areas such as Smart City, Cyber Security, Smart Industry, Climate Change and Continuous Learning
 NEIMED (Nederlands expertise en innovatiecentrum maatschappelijke effecten demografische krimp): an alliance with Maastricht University and Zuyd University of Applied Sciences

The Open University also has two support staff departments: the Department of Administration and the Department of Support Services. These provide services ranging from academic affairs to student administration.

Courses of study
The Open University offers courses of study at the bachelor's and master's degree levels in the following disciplines: cultural studies, education science, law, management, psychology, science and technology. The university collaborates with Flemish universities to enable Belgian students to attend classes. Five of its master's degree programmes were top-ranked in 2017.

Faculty 
The following are present and former faculty members of the Open Universiteit:

 Harold Krikke

References

External links 
 

Distance education institutions based in the Netherlands
Universities in the Netherlands
Educational institutions established in 1984
1984 establishments in the Netherlands
Education in Limburg (Netherlands)
South Limburg (Netherlands)
Buildings and structures in Heerlen